With respect to aircraft performance, a ceiling is the maximum density altitude an aircraft can reach under a set of conditions, as determined by its flight envelope.

Service ceiling
Service ceiling is where the rate of climb drops below a prescribed value.

The service ceiling is the maximum usable altitude of an aircraft. Specifically, it is the density altitude at which flying in a clean configuration, at the best rate of climb airspeed for that altitude and with all engines operating and producing maximum continuous power, will produce a given rate of climb. A typical value might be  climb, or on the order of  climb for jet aircraft.

The one-engine inoperative (OEI) service ceiling of a twin-engine, fixed-wing aircraft is the density altitude at which flying in a clean configuration, at the best rate of climb airspeed for that altitude with one engine producing maximum continuous power and the other engine shut down and feathered, will produce a given rate of climb, usually .

Absolute ceiling
The absolute ceiling is the highest altitude at which an aircraft can sustain level flight. Due to the thin air at higher altitudes, a much higher true airspeed is required to generate sufficient lift on the wings. The absolute ceiling is therefore the altitude at which the engines are operating at maximum thrust, yet only generate enough lift to match the weight of the aircraft. Hence, the aircraft will not have any excess capacity to climb further. At absolute ceiling, the aircraft can no longer accelerate, since any acceleration will lead to higher airspeed and therefore excess lift. Stated technically, it is the altitude where the maximum sustained (with no decreasing airspeed) rate of climb is zero.

Compared to service ceiling, the absolute ceiling of commercial aircraft is much higher than for standard operational purposes. In the Concorde's case, it was tested to be . It is impossible to reach for most (because of the vertical speed asymptotically approaching zero) without afterburners or other devices temporarily increasing thrust. Another factor that makes it impossible for some aircraft to reach their absolute ceiling, even with temporary increases in thrust, is the aircraft reaching the "coffin corner". Flight at the absolute ceiling is also not economically advantageous due to the low indicated airspeed which can be sustained: although the true airspeed (TAS) at an altitude is typically greater than indicated airspeed (IAS), the difference is not enough to compensate for the fact that IAS at which minimum drag is achieved is usually low, so a flight at an absolute ceiling altitude results in a low TAS as well, and therefore in a high fuel burn rate per distance traveled. The absolute ceiling varies with the air temperature and, overall, the aircraft weight (usually calculated at MTOW).

See also
Aerodynamic ceiling

References

Aerodynamics
Altitudes in aviation
Aircraft performance